Loveleen Kaur Sasan, also known as Lovey Sasan, is an Indian television actress. She is known for playing Paridhi Modi in Saath Nibhaana Saathiya.

Career

Television debut and struggle (2011-2012) 

In 2011, Sasan started her career with two popular shows: Bade Achhe Lagte Hain and Kitani Mohabbat Hai (season 2). She played the secretary Jenny and Arjun's ex-girlfriend.

In 2012, Sasan doing episodic role in Savdhaan India and Anamika as well as she is doing recurring cast in Kya Huaa Tera Vaada as Ankita.

Rose a Fame & break from television and debut In Pollywood (2013-2018) 

After one half year, from 2013 to 2014 she get particular role in show Kaisa Yeh Ishq Hai... Ajab Sa Risk Hai as Rano in supporting role.

In 2014 she doing episodic role in Love by Chance as Sakshi.

In July 2014 to 23 February 2017, she portrayed as Paridhi Modi in the popular show Saath Nibhaana Saathiya. 

In 2018, she debut in Pollywood in blockbuster film Subedar Joginder Singh as Bacchan Kaur. Her character was loved by the audiences.

Television

Filmography

References

Year of birth missing (living people)
Living people
21st-century Indian actresses
Actresses in Punjabi cinema
Indian television actresses